Big Brother (also known as in) is a Romanian version of the international reality television franchise Big Brother produced by Endemol. A group of people (called the Housemates) live together in an isolated house. They don't have TV, the Internet, newspapers or watches.  24 hours a day, their life is recorded by hidden cameras in all the rooms in the House. The Housemates are completely isolated from the outside world. Every week, each of them must enter the Diary Room and nominate two of the other people for public eviction. The two or more housemates with most negative votes become nominated. For almost a week the TV viewers have to decide which of them to be evicted, voting via SMS or phone calls.

Every week the Housemates have a weekly task. Depending on whether they successfully complete the task or not, their shopping budget is increased or decreased.

During the final week, the viewers vote for which of the remaining people in the House they want to win the show. The person with the most positive votes becomes a winner and receives a big money prize. In the first season was the prize US$50,000 and in the second season was the prize €75,000.

The show in Romania lasted for two seasons. Both aired on Prima TV.

History

Production 
Prima TV acquired the format of Big Brother and announced on 2 December 2002 that it will be launched in the early months of 2003. A team of eleven people was sent to Budapest for the Hungarian version of Big Brother, for four months to learn how the show will work.

Spin-offs 
Following the end of the first season, a show called Big Brother – Revanșa aired on Prima TV, which consisted of several housemates discussing for half an hour what happened during their time in the house and what they plan to do after the show finished.

Big Brother 1 (2003) 
The first season started on 16 March 2003 and ended on 6 July 2003, lasting for 112 days. It was hosted by Andreea Raicu and Virgil Ianţu. The winner was Sorin Fișteag "Soso".

The house was located in the area of Semănătoarea.

In June 2003, Laura Stanciu, the spokesperson for the show, released a book which contains behind-the-scenes information about the season.

Housemates

Nominations table
Public nominations: The first housemate in each box was nominated for two points, and the second housemate was nominated for one point.

Big Brother 2 (2004) 
The second season was produced by Endemol and aired from March 13, 2004 to June 14, 2004, lasting for 91 days. It was hosted by Andreea Raicu and Virgil Ianţu. The winner was Iustin.

Housemates

Nominations table

Reception and cancellation
The show quickly gained the attention of the Orthodox Church, claiming that they have warned the producers regarding shows which "promote prostitution and violence." Furthermore, the contestants in the first season were "shy" and "reluctant" to perform suggestive actions, with one contestant being dubbed "the girl with the cape" due to the fact that she wore a cape each time she showered.

News outlets believed that pre-recorded material was used for the first season rather than live recordings; their affirmations would be later confirmed by the show's spokesperson. The latter claimed that pre-recorded material was indeed used as it was "impossible to broadcast it live due to the bad weather at the time."

The ratings for the first season were "disappointing", as the show did not live up to the viewers's expectations, most likely due to the suggestions that the National Audiovisual Council proposed to the producers to "keep the show civil." To make things worse, the season's grand finale was eclipsed by the screening of the Indian film Yaadon Ki Baaraat on Antena 1. The show ended up, however, being a financial success.

During the second season, some contestants engaged in racy activities. Their actions were met with backlash by the Orthodox Church, the National Audiovisual Council and several political figures, which criticized the show for "promoting prostitution." The National Audiovisual Council also requested for Prima TV to show their decision for sanctioning the show due to violating the Audiovisual Act by "broadcasting pornographic content." Distrust was also created between the network and some viewers, who believed their online votes were not counted.

Following the sanctions imposed by the National Audiovisual Council, the breaching of autochthonous regulations and fluctuating ratings, Prima TV "did not see why they should keep a show like this with high production costs." After the show's cancellation, the network aimed to re-brand itself.

In 2014, Prima TV had announced that they acquired the format of Utopia, which worked similarly the way Big Brother did and that it would air during the fall of that year. Although, in October, Cristian Burci, the owner of Prima TV, stated that "the show will be scheduled to air either at the end of the year or next year." Subsequently, the show was "postponed indefinitely" due to the "financial issues that Burci was facing."

References

Romania
2003 Romanian television series debuts
2004 Romanian television series endings
2000s Romanian television series
Romanian reality television series
Prima TV original programming